Brendan Ogle is an Irish trade union official.

Career
He led the Irish Locomotive Drivers Association and is the former secretary of the ESB Group of unions. He was the first non-ESB employee to become secretary of the GoU. During his tenure he caused controversy by referring to workers in the ESB as 'spoilt' at a meeting of the dissident Republican group Éirígí.  Throughout this time he was, according to the Irish Independent, "subject to much adverse media comment" and he and his family endured threats to kill them. Among those to publicly defend him were former Irish presidential candidate and senior Labour Party member Fergus Finlay.

In March 2018, Ogle announced that he would launch a new political party in September. As of May 2021 no such party has been launched.

Personal life
He comes from Dundalk, County Louth.

References

Irish trade unionists
People from County Louth
Year of birth missing (living people)
Living people